La Maldicion de la Bestia (The Curse of the Beast) is a 1975 Spanish horror film that is the eighth in a long series about the werewolf Count Waldemar Daninsky, played by Paul Naschy. The film has also been known as The Werewolf and the Yeti, Night of the Howling Beast and Hall of the Mountain King.  This film ignored the events from the earlier Hombre Lobo films and provided an all-new origin for Waldemar's lycanthropy, having the curse transmitted to Waldemar by the bites of two female werewolves. A yeti is woven into the storyline (as in The Fury of the Wolfman), but in this film the Yeti is not the direct cause of Waldemar's lycanthropy. Fernando Florido and Adolfo Ponte handled the special effects throughout the film.

The film premiered at the Sitges International Film Festival in Spain in October 1975, where Naschy was awarded Best Actor for his role in the film. The film was first shown theatrically in Spain in December 1975 as La Maldicion de la Bestia. 

An English-dubbed international version was created and titled The Werewolf and the Yeti. But when the film was finally theatrically released in the U.S. in 1977, it was shown instead as Night of the Howling Beast. It was years later released on DVD as The Werewolf and the Yeti 

Naschy followed up this film with a 1980 sequel called El Retorno del Hombre Lobo/Return of the Wolf Man.

Plot
Waldemar Daninsky goes to Tibet to guide for an expedition led by Professor Lacombe to look for proof that the yeti exists. Waldemar gets separated from the main party and captured by two cannibalistic werewolf women in an ice cave, who transform him into a werewolf by biting him. Waldemar's companions  are kidnapped by a band of Tibetan pirates who torture their victims gruesomely, and in the film's grand climax, Waldemar (in werewolf form) gets to fight not only Sekkar Khan, the leader of the bandits, but a genuine Yeti as well in bloody hand-to-fang combat. Waldemar kills the Yeti by biting his throat out, but in the process he is gravely wounded. The professor's daughter Sylvia, who is in love with Waldemar, manages to cure him of his lycanthropy by rubbing a small Tibetan flower mixed with her own blood on him. In the end, Waldemar changes back into a man and goes off into the sunset with Sylvia, making this the only Hombre Lobo film with a happy ending. Although a Yeti is involved in the plot, it is the two werewolf women (and not the Yeti) who transform Waldemar into a werewolf in this film, thus giving him yet another origin for his lycanthropy. This film involved more nudity and graphic gore than most of Naschy's other Wolfman films, and as a result was never theatrically shown in the U.K.

Cast
 Paul Naschy as Waldemar Daninsky
 Mercedes Molina as Sylvia Lacombe
 Silvia Solar as Wandessa
 Gil Vidal as Larry Talbot
 Josep Castillo Escalona as Professor Lacombe
 Luis Induni as Sekkar Khan
 Ventura Oller as Ralph
 Veronica Miriel as Melody
 Juan Velilla as Norman
 Jose Luis Chinchilla as Temugin
 Ana Maria Mauri as Princess Ulka
 Carmen Cervera 
 Juan Olle 
 Fernando Ulloa as Lama
 Gaspar "Indio" Gonzalez as Tigre
 Pepa Ferrer as Yanika
 Victor Israel as Joel
 Eduardo Alcazar

Release
The film was first released theatrically in Spain in December 1975 as La maldicion de la bestia. It was shown in France as Dans Les Griffes du Loup Garou / In the Claws of the Loup Garou, and in Belgium as Loup Garou: The Werewolf. It was only released theatrically in the United States in 1977 by Independent-International Pictures under the title Night of the Howling Beast.

The film was banned in the UK by the BBFC under the Video Recordings Act of 1984 and was featured on the "video nasties" list. It was released as a "pre-cert" video tape in the UK.

The film was released on VHS Home Video in the 1980s under three different titles... Hall of the Mountain King (severely edited), Night of the Howling Beast and The Werewolf and the Yeti.

The film has been released on DVD in its native Spain by Tripictures. It was also released on Blu-ray Disc in the US in 2017 by Shout Factory as part of their 5-movie collection The Paul Naschy Collection II, under the title The Werewolf and the Yeti.

References

External links

 

1975 films
1975 horror films
Spanish vampire films
Spanish werewolf films
Films about Yeti
Waldemar Daninsky series
1970s Spanish-language films